Plešivec may refer to:

Plešivec, Slovakia
Plešivec, Velenje, Slovenia
Plešivec (Ore Mountains), Czech Republic
Pleshivets (scientific transliteration Plešivec), a village in Ruzhintsi municipality, Vidin Province, Bulgaria
Plešivica, Ljutomer, Slovenia, named Plešivec in older sources